Podocarpus magnifolius is a species of conifer in the family Podocarpaceae. It is found in Bolivia, Colombia, Peru, Panama and Venezuela.

Description
Trees up to 30 m tall, dark brown bark. Leaves elliptic to oblong, 3–29 cm long and 1.2–3 cm wide, apex acumiunate, base cuneate. Male cones axillary, sessile, solitary, up to 5 cm long. Ovules on a receptacle of 1.2 cm long, at the end of a 1–2 cm long peduncle. Seed ovoid, bright red, 1 cm long.

Distribution and habitat
Podocarpus magnifolius can be found from Panama and eastern Venezuela south to Bolivia in montane and cloud forests from 850 to 2900 m.

References

magnifolius
Least concern plants
Trees of Bolivia
Trees of Colombia
Trees of Peru
Trees of Venezuela
Trees of Panama
Taxonomy articles created by Polbot